Hugo Griebert (1867-1924) was a stamp dealer and philatelist who was a specialist in the stamps of Spain and who was entered on the Roll of Distinguished Philatelists in 1921.

He was awarded the Crawford Medal by the Royal Philatelic Society London for his work The stamps of Spain 1850-1854.

Selected publications
The stamps of Spain 1850-1854. London: Hugo Griebert, 1920.
A study of the stamps of Uruguay. London: Hugo Griebert, 1910.

References

Stamp dealers
Philately of Spain
1867 births
1924 deaths
Spanish philatelists
Signatories to the Roll of Distinguished Philatelists